Steinþór Freyr Þorsteinsson (born 29 July 1985) is an Icelandic footballer who currently plays for KA in the Besta deild. He is known for his outstanding athleticism and long throw-ins. 
He was voted the best player of the first seven rounds of the Icelandic deild in both 2009 and 2010.

On 31 July 2010 he signed a -year contract with Örgryte IS, but was released when the club went bankrupt in early February 2011. In March 2011 he signed a one-year contract with Norwegian club Sandnes Ulf. At Sandnes Ulf, Steinþór showed an amazing skill to win penalties and free kicks. In his first 9 games for the team, he had already won 6 penalties for the team.

International career
Steinþór played his first senior national team game for Iceland in November 2009 against Iran.

Career statistics

References

External links

Profile at Sportic Players Management
Short video at Vimeo

1985 births
Living people
Steinthor Freyr Thorsteinsson
Steinthor Freyr Thorsteinsson
Steinthor Freyr Thorsteinsson
Steinthor Freyr Thorsteinsson
Örgryte IS players
Sandnes Ulf players
Viking FK players
Superettan players
Eliteserien players
Norwegian First Division players
Steinthor Freyr Thorsteinsson
Expatriate footballers in Sweden
Expatriate footballers in Norway
Steinthor Freyr Thorsteinsson
Steinthor Freyr Thorsteinsson
Steinthor Freyr Thorsteinsson
Steinthor Freyr Thorsteinsson
Steinthor Freyr Thorsteinsson
Association football midfielders